João Aguiar may refer to:

 João Aguiar (writer) (1943–2010), Portuguese writer and journalist
 João Aguiar (swimmer) (born 1983), Angolan swimmer